Alcmaeon was the last perpetual Archon of Athens of the Meontid lineage.  In 753 BC, he was succeeded by his brother Charops, the first archon with a limited term of office of ten years.

References

Ancient Athenians
Alcmaeonidae
8th-century BC Greek people
Eponymous archons
8th-century BC Ancient Greek statesmen